Personal service may refer to:

 Personal service sector of the economy, which delivers services rather than goods
 Service of process, delivery of court documents to a person
 Personal Services, 1987 comedy film set in a brothel

Taxation
 Personal service corporation in United States tax law
 IR35, United Kingdom tax law for individuals paid through personal service companies